The Avery Pontiac Building is a historic building in Columbus, Ohio. It is located in Columbus's Near East Side, roughly between the Franklin Park and Olde Towne East neighborhoods. The building was added to the Columbus Near East Side District (on the National Register of Historic Places) in 1978. It was individually listed on the Columbus Register of Historic Properties in 1984.

The  building was constructed as the Avery Pontiac dealership in 1909. It became used for a warehouse and later as an artist and photographer living space. In March 2017, the city forced over a dozen tenants out, after finding numerous serious code violations and deeming it unsafe for habitation. In November 2017, a developer announced it wants to convert the buildings into apartment units and a first-floor restaurant. The project, estimated to cost $1.5 million, would create 15 living units. A renovation process was reported to be approved by city commissions, though not yet approved by city council, as of January 2018.

See also
 National Register of Historic Places listings in Columbus, Ohio

References

Commercial buildings completed in 1909
Columbus Register properties
Buildings and structures in Columbus, Ohio
1909 establishments in Ohio
Office buildings in Columbus, Ohio
National Register of Historic Places in Columbus, Ohio
Historic district contributing properties in Columbus, Ohio